Torture Ship is a 1939 American science fiction horror film directed by Victor Halperin, based on Jack London's 1899 short story "A Thousand Deaths". The film stars Lyle Talbot as a mad scientist who performs experiments regarding "the criminal mind" on captured criminals onboard his private ship.

Cast

Production
The film is based on the short story "A Thousand Deaths" by Jack London originally published in Black Cat Magazine in May 1899.

By the end of the first week of August 1939, George Sayre and Harvey Huntley completed the script for Torture Ship and the film was scheduled to start on August 14 but was held back.  Filming was then set to begin by the last week of August but no cast was yet assembled. The cast was announced in September with John Miller originally set to play Jesse, thought Skelton Knaggs appears in the final film.

Release
Torture Ship was distributed by Producers Distributing Corporation on October 22, 1939.

Reception
From contemporary reviews, "Herb." of Variety noted the acting in the film stating "there can be no quarrel with the acting of the princpals" but that Torture Ship was a "quickie action thriller that misses fire all the way on its possibilities" and that the film "has so many unreasonable and unexplainable points that it will annoy even the most jueve-minded" The Film Daily also praised the film's acting while finding Halperin's direction as "O.K." while declaring the film "has enough punch and drama to satisfy the nabe trade."

References

Sources

External links 

1939 films
American black-and-white films
Films based on works by Jack London
Films based on short fiction
Films directed by Victor Halperin
1930s English-language films